internet Speech Audio Codec (iSAC) is a wideband speech codec, developed by Global IP Solutions (GIPS) (acquired by Google Inc in 2011). It is suitable for VoIP applications and streaming audio. The encoded blocks have to be encapsulated in a suitable protocol for transport, e.g. RTP.

It is one of the codecs used by AIM Triton, the Gizmo5, QQ, and Google Talk. It was formerly a proprietary codec licensed by Global IP Solutions. As of June 2011, it is part of open source WebRTC project, which includes a royalty-free license for iSAC when using the WebRTC codebase.

Parameters and features 
 Sampling frequency of 16 kHz (wideband) or 32 kHz (superwideband)
 Adaptive and variable bit rate of 10 kbit/s to 32 kbit/s (wideband) or 10 kbit/s to 52 kbit/s (superwideband)
 Adaptive packet size 30 to 60 ms
 Complexity comparable to G.722.2 at comparable bit-rates
 Algorithmic delay of frame size plus 3 ms

See also 
 iLBC
 Opus (audio codec)
 SILK
 G.722
 Speex
 List of codecs

References

External links 
 WebRTC codecs - GIT- source code for iSAC and other codecs

Speech codecs
Free audio codecs
Formerly proprietary software